General Sir Henry Dermot Daly  (25 October 1823 – 21 July 1895) was a senior British Indian Army officer, colonial administrator, Liberal Unionist politician and founder of Daly College.

Biography

Daly was the son of Lieutenant-Colonel Francis Dermot Daly, an officer in the 4th Light Dragoons, and his wife, Mary McIntosh. He joined the Bombay Infantry as an officer cadet in 1840. Along with several similarly aged young officers, such as Herbert Edwardes and Patrick Alexander Vans Agnew, Daly was sent to "advise" the Sikhs as part of Henry Lawrence's "Young Men". He served in the Second Anglo-Sikh War and was present at the Siege of Multan. On 18 May 1849, he raised the 1st Punjab Irregular Cavalry, which subsequently became the 21st Prince Albert Victor's Own Cavalry (Frontier Force) (Daly's Horse). Daly was promoted to the rank of captain in 1854 and led his regiment during the Indian Mutiny. The regiment operated in North India and took part in the Siege of Delhi and the Relief of Lucknow. He went on the command the Brigade of Hodson's Horse during the war. Daly was twice recommended for the Victoria Cross as a result of his conduct.

He subsequently served in the Bombay Staff Corps. Daly held the position of Governor General of India's Agent, in Central India between 1870 and 1881, and was promoted to lieutenant-general in 1877. He became a Knight Commander of the Order of the Bath on 29 May 1875, and a Knight Grand Cross in the same order on 25 May 1889. Before leaving India, Daly had taken a great interest in education and had begun a College in Indore which was later named after him. In the General Election of 1886, Daly stood as the Liberal Unionist candidate in Dundee. He was beaten by the Liberal Party candidate. He also unsuccessfully contested the seat for the Liberal Unionists in the 1888 Dundee by-election.

Daly married, firstly, Susan, the daughter of Edward Kirkpatrick, on 21 October 1852. Together they had eight children; two of their sons were Sir Hugh Daly and Arthur Daly. He married, secondly, Charlotte, daughter of James Coape, in 1882, and they had one son.

References

1823 births
1895 deaths
British Indian Army officers
Knights Grand Cross of the Order of the Bath
Companions of the Order of the Indian Empire
Bombay Staff Corps officers
British military personnel of the Second Anglo-Sikh War
British military personnel of the Indian Rebellion of 1857
People from Ryde
Founders of educational institutions
Administrators in British India
19th-century British politicians
British educational theorists
British Indian Army generals
Liberal Unionist Party parliamentary candidates